Magnus Ramsfjell (born 17 July 1997 in Tønsberg) is a Norwegian curler from  Trondheim.

Curling career
Ramsfjell was the skip of the Norwegian junior men's team in four straight World Junior Curling Championships from 2016 to 2019. At the 2016 World Junior Curling Championships, Ramsfjell led his team of Bendik Ramsfjell, Magnus Vågberg, Elias Høstmælingen and Eskil Vintervold to a 5-4 round robin record, missing the playoffs. At the 2017 World Junior Curling Championships, his team improved to a 6-3 round robin record, which put them in a tiebreaker game against Canada's Tyler Tardi rink for the final playoff spot. They beat Canada in the tiebreaker game, but lost to Scotland's Cameron Bryce in the 3 vs. 4 game. This put them in the bronze medal game, where they faced Scotland again. This time, they would beat the Scots to claim the bronze medal.

At the 2018 World Junior Curling Championships, Ramsfjell would skip a new team which consisted of Kristian Foss, Michael Mellemseter, Andreas Hårstad and Jørgen Myran. This team would be less successful, finishing with a 4-5 record, missing the playoffs. The team played in the 2019 World Junior Curling Championships (with Foss off the team). The team squeaked into the playoffs with a 6-3 record. However, they lost to Canada (Tardi) in the semifinal and Scotland (Ross Whyte) in the bronze medal game to finish fourth.

A month after the 2019 World Juniors, Ramsfjell skipped Team Norway at the 2019 Winter Universiade. His team of Martin Sesaker, Bendik Ramsfjell and Gaute Nepstad went on to win the gold medal.

Later that month, Ramsfjell and his junior rink would compete at the 2019 World Men's Curling Championship, finishing 12th with a 2-10 record. They qualified by upsetting former World Champion Thomas Ulsrud in the Norwegian championship.

Outside of men's curling, Ramsfjell and his sister Maia represented Norway at the 2018 World Mixed Doubles Curling Championship. After going undefeated (7-0) in group play, they lost their first playoff game to Russia, and were eliminated.

Personal life
As of 2019, Ramsfjell was a masters student in electrical engineering. He attended the Norwegian University of Science and Technology. Ramsfjell is the son of three-time world champion and Olympic bronze medalist Eigil Ramsfjell.

Grand Slam record

References

External links
 

Living people
1997 births
Norwegian male curlers
Sportspeople from Tønsberg
Sportspeople from Trondheim
Universiade medalists in curling
Norwegian University of Science and Technology alumni
Universiade gold medalists for Norway
Competitors at the 2019 Winter Universiade
21st-century Norwegian people